Fox Township is one of the fourteen townships of Carroll County, Ohio, United States. As of the 2020 census, the population was 977.

Geography
Located in the eastern part of the county, it borders the following townships:
Franklin Township, Columbiana County - northeast
Washington Township, Columbiana County - east
Brush Creek Township, Jefferson County - southeast
Springfield Township, Jefferson County - south
Lee Township - southwest
Washington Township - west
East Township - northwest

No municipalities are located in Fox Township, although the unincorporated community of Mechanicstown lies in the township's northwest

Name and history
It is the only Fox Township statewide.
Fox Township, which is all of township 13, range 4 of the Old Seven Ranges, was taken from Columbiana County by the Ohio legislature in 1832–33.

On July 26, 1863 Major General John H. Morgan, C.S.A. of Morgan's Raiders and General James Shackleford U.S.A. fought the northernmost engagement of the American Civil War near Mechanicstown in this township.

Government

The township is governed by a three-member board of trustees, who are elected in November of odd-numbered years to a four-year term beginning on the following January 1. Two are elected in the year after the presidential election and one is elected in the year before it. There is also an elected township fiscal officer, who serves a four-year term beginning on April 1 of the year after the election, which is held in November of the year before the presidential election. Vacancies in the fiscal officership or on the board of trustees are filled by the remaining trustees.

Education
Students attend the Carrollton Exempted Village School District in most of the township and Edison Local School District in the southeast corner.

Notable natives and residents
Benjamin F. Potts, territorial governor of Montana

References

External links
County website

Townships in Carroll County, Ohio
Townships in Ohio